This is the progression of world record improvements of the 110 metres hurdles M35 division of Masters athletics.

Key

Note: Allen Johnson's mark was over 42" (1.067 meters) tall sprint hurdles which were the Masters specification at the time of the mark.

References

Masters athletics world record progressions
Sprint hurdles